The Michael Davitt Shield is a Scottish Gaelic Football pre-season tournament founded in 2001. The competition takes place in the April of each season. The trophy is named after Irish Republican activist and founder of the Irish National Land League, Michael Davitt. Glaschu Gaels were the inaugural champions in 2000 and have won the competition a record four times. On 30 April 2009, Tir Conaill Harps won the competition for the second time in their history after overcoming record winners and city rivals Glaschu Gaels 1-10 to 1-06 in Coatbridge.

References

Gaelic football competitions in Scotland
2000 establishments in Scotland
Recurring sporting events established in 2000